APPC may refer to:

Technology
 IBM Advanced Program-to-Program Communication
Linux App Containers

Organizations
 Annenberg Public Policy Center
 Association des Psychothérapeutes Pastoraux du Canada (fr)
 Advanced Polypropylene Company
 Association of Professional Political Consultants
 Asian-Pacific Postal College, part of the Asian-Pacific Postal Union